Eugnosta is a genus of moths belonging to the family Tortricidae.

Species
Eugnosta acanthana Razowski, 1967
Eugnosta aguila (Razowski & Becker, 1986)
Eugnosta anxifera Razowski, 1993
Eugnosta aphrobapta (Meyrick, 1931)
Eugnosta argentinae (Razowski, 1967)
Eugnosta argyroplaca (Meyrick, 1931)
Eugnosta arrecta Razowski, 1970
Eugnosta assecula (Meyrick, 1909)
Eugnosta asthenia (Clarke, 1968)
Eugnosta beevorana (Comstock, 1940)
Eugnosta bimaculana (Robinson, 1869)
Eugnosta brownana Metzler & Forbes, 2012
Eugnosta busckana (Comstock, 1939)
Eugnosta californica (Razowski, 1986)
Eugnosta caracana Razowski & Becker, 2002
Eugnosta cataracta Aarvik, 2004
Eugnosta chalasma Razowski, 1993
Eugnosta chalicophora Razowski, 1999
Eugnosta chemsakiana (Razowski, 1986)
Eugnosta chromophanes Razowski, 1994
Eugnosta cipoana Razowski & Becker, 2007
Eugnosta deceptana (Busck, 1907)
Eugnosta desinens (Razowski, 1986)
Eugnosta dives (Butler, 1878)
Eugnosta dyschiria (Razowski, 1986)
Eugnosta emarcida (Razowski & Becker, 1986)
Eugnosta ensinoana Razowski & Becker, 2007
Eugnosta erigeronana (Riley, 1881)
Eugnosta euglypta (Meyrick, 1927)
Eugnosta falarica Razowski, 1970
Eugnosta fenestrana Razowski, 1964
Eugnosta feriata (Meyrick, 1913)
Eugnosta fernandoana Razowski & Becker, 2007
Eugnosta fraudulenta Razowski & Becker, 2007
Eugnosta heteroclita Razowski, 1993
Eugnosta hydrargyrana (Eversmann, 1842)
Eugnosta hypsitropha (Bradley, 1965)
Eugnosta hysterosiana (Razowski, 1967)
Eugnosta jequiena Razowski & Becker, 2007
Eugnosta lathoniana (Hubner, [1799-1800])
Eugnosta lauta Razowski, 1993
Eugnosta leonana (Razowski, 1986)
Eugnosta lukaszi Razowski, 2005
Eugnosta macneilli (Razowski, 1986)
Eugnosta magnificana (Rebel, 1914)
Eugnosta marginana Aarvik, 2010
Eugnosta matengana Razowski, 1993
Eugnosta medioxima (Razowski, 1986)
Eugnosta medvedevi (Gerasimov, 1929)
Eugnosta mexicana (Busck, 1907)
Eugnosta meyi Aarvik, 2004
Eugnosta misella Razowski, 1993
Eugnosta mitis Razowski, 1993
Eugnosta molybdanthes (Meyrick, 1932)
Eugnosta molybdina (Clarke, 1968)
Eugnosta multifasciana (Kennel, 1899)
Eugnosta namibiana Aarvik, 2004
Eugnosta niveicaput Razowski, 2005
Eugnosta ochrolemma (Razowski, 1986)
Eugnosta opalina (Razowski, 1986)
Eugnosta ouralia (Razowski, 1986)
Eugnosta pamirana Obraztsov, 1943
Eugnosta parapamirana Razowski, 2005
Eugnosta parmisella Razowski, 2005
Eugnosta parreyssiana (Duponchel, in Godart, 1842)
Eugnosta percnoptila (Meyrick, 1933)
Eugnosta plusiana (Kennel, 1899)
Eugnosta polymacula Razowski & Becker, 2002
Eugnosta proanoa Razowski & Pelz, 2001
Eugnosta replicata (Meyrick, 1913)
Eugnosta romanovi (Kennel, 1900)
Eugnosta rufocentra Razowski & Becker, 2002
Eugnosta saltillana (Razowski, 1986)
Eugnosta sartana (Hübner, 1823)
Eugnosta sebasta Razowski, 1994
Eugnosta selecta (Meyrick, 1931)
Eugnosta stigmatica (Meyrick, 1909)
Eugnosta subsynaetera Razowski & Becker, 2002
Eugnosta synaetera Razowski & Becker, 1994
Eugnosta telemacana Razowski & Becker, 2007
Eugnosta tenacia Razowski & Becker, 1994
Eugnosta trimeni (Felder & Rogenhofer, 1875)
Eugnosta uganoa Razowski, 1993
Eugnosta umbraculata (Meyrick, 1918)
Eugnosta umtamvuna Razowski, 2015
Eugnosta unifasciana Aarvik, 2010
Eugnosta ussuriana (Caradja, 1926)
Eugnosta vecorda Razowski, 1993
Eugnosta willettana (Comstock, 1939)
Eugnosta xanthochroma Razowski, 1993

Unknown placement
Eugnosta chionochlaena (Meyrick, 1932)

Synonyms
 Argyrolepia Stephens, 1829, Syst. Cat. Br. Insects (2): 190. Type species: Tortrix lathoniana Hübner [1799-1800].
 Safra Walker, 1863, List Specimens lepid. Insects Colln. Br. Mus. 27: 195. Type species: Safra metaphaeella Walker, 1863.
 Trachybyrsis Meyrick, 1927 (synonymized by Razowski, 2011: 404)
 Carolella Busck, 1939 (replacement name for Pharmacis Hübner, 1823). (synonymized by Razowski, 2011: 404)
 Pharmacis Hübner, 1823 (preoccupied)

See also
List of Tortricidae genera

References

 , 2010: Review of East African Cochylini (Lepidoptera, Tortricidae) with description of new species. Norwegian Journal of Entomology 57 (2): 81-108. Abstract: .
 , 2005: World catalogue of insects volume 5 Tortricidae.
 , [1825] 1816, Verz. bekannter Schmett.: 394.
 , 2012: The Lepidoptera of White Sands National Monument 5: Two new species of Cochylini (Lepidoptera, Tortricidae, Tortricinae). Zootaxa 3444: 51–60. Abstract: .
 , 2011: Diagnoses and remarks on genera of Tortricidae, 2: Cochylini (Lepidoptera: Tortricidae). Shilap Revista de Lepidopterologia 39 (156): 397–414.
 , 2002: Systematic and faunistic data on Neotropical Cochylini (Lepidoptera: Tortricidae), with descriptions of new species. Part.1. Acta zool. cracov. 45: 287-316  
  2010: An annotated catalogue of the types of Tortricidae (Lepidoptera) in the collection of the Royal Museum for Central Africa (Tervuren, Belgium) with descriptions of new genera and new species. Zootaxa 2469: 1-77. Abstract: .
 , 2013: An illustrated catalogue of the specimens of Tortricidae in the Iziko South African Museum, Cape Town (Lepidoptera: Tortricidae). Shilap Revista de Lepidopterologia 41 (162): 213–240.

External links
tortricidae.com

 
Cochylini
Tortricidae genera
Taxa named by Jacob Hübner